The  is a 16.1-kilometre-long light rail line operated by Hiroshima Electric Railway (Hiroden) connecting Hiroshima and Hatsukaichi, Hiroshima Prefecture, Japan. It has been operated since 1922.

Due to historical reasons, the line is the only Hiroden line classified as a "railway" under the Railway Business Act, whereas other lines are classified as "tramways" under the Tramway Act. The line operated exclusively as a railway with high floor trains until 1958 when through operations were established and trams started operating between Hiroden City Tram lines and the Miyajima Line. Today, despite its distinction from other part of the system, most trains on the line are through services from the tramway section, namely the Main Line which is connected to Hiroshima Station.

Stations

References 

  Tram Route Map - Distances between Stations and Tram Stops (Hiroshima Electric Railway)

Miyajima Line
Railway lines opened in 1922